The 2021 Tasmanian State League season is the 129th season of the men's Australian rules football competition in Tasmania. The season will be contested by seven teams across twenty-one home and away rounds and six finals series between 2 April and 12 September.

Participating Clubs

Fixtures

Round 1

Round 2

Round 3

Round 4

Round 5

Round 6

Round 7

Round 8

Round 9

Round 10

Round 11

Round 12

Round 13

Round 14

Round 15

Round 16

Round 17

Round 18

Round 19

Round 20

Round 21

Ladder

Finals series

1st Semi-final

2nd Semi-final

Preliminary Final

Grand Final

References

External links
 Tasmanian State League Website
 Season Overview (Australian Football)

2021
2021 in Australian rules football